Lidovka is the name of several rural localities in Russia:
Lidovka, Nizhny Novgorod Oblast, a village in Balakhonikhinsky Selsoviet of Arzamassky District of Nizhny Novgorod Oblast
Lidovka, Primorsky Krai, a village under the administrative jurisdiction of Dalnegorsk City Under Krai Jurisdiction, Primorsky Krai